Victor Mejia (born 10 April 1993) is a Belizean international footballer who plays for Verdes FC, as a defender.

Career
He has played club football for Verdes FC.

He made his international debut for Belize in 2018.

References

1993 births
Living people
Belizean footballers
Belize international footballers
Verdes FC players
Association football defenders